Ross H. McKenzie is a Professor in  Physics at the University of Queensland. From 2008 to 2012 he held an Australian Professorial Fellowship from the Australian Research Council.

Works
McKenzie works on  quantum many-body theory of complex materials ranging from organic superconductors to biomolecules to rare-earth oxide catalysts. He is critical of claims that quantum effects are significant in understanding the function of biomolecules. He is author of a blog, "Condensed Concepts: Ruminations on emergent phenomena in condensed phases of matter".

McKenzie is a Christian. He is author of a blog  "Soli Deo Gloria: Thoughts on Theology, Science, and Culture". He has written several papers about the relationship between science and theology.

Education
He received his BSc from Australian National University.  He obtained an MA from Princeton University. He completed his PhD at Princeton University in 1989, under Jim Sauls, with a thesis entitled: Nonlinear interaction of zero sound with the order parameter collective modes in superfluid 3He-B.

References

External links
UQ researcher page
Condensed concepts blog
Soli deo gloria blog
McKenzie's testimony of Jesus

Living people
Princeton University alumni
Australian National University alumni
Australian physicists
Quantum physicists
1960 births
Christian apologists
Rare earth scientists